Chaozhou Vocational Technical School is a secondary school in Chaozhou City, Guangdong Province, China. It was founded in 1983. Its predecessor was the "Chaozhou Baihuatai Occupation High School", known to locals as  the "Baihuatai". From under the Education Bureau of Chaozhou city.

History 
The school was founded in September 1983.

In 2000, the "ordinary high fever" continues to heat up, the every year Chaozhou Baihuatai occupation school enrollment number less than 130 people, occupation education neglected. At this time, Zhang Senzhen served as the principal of the school, and has served as so far, the enrollment began to rise.

In 2006, in order to completely solve the problem of lack of educational facilities and revitalize the local secondary occupation education resources, Chaozhou city authorities decided in Chaoan county (now Chaoan District) Guxiang town, Fengyang village Chaozhou agricultural school campus expansion. Construction of new campus Feng Yang Chaozhou Municipal People's government has been listed as a key construction project in Chaozhou city.

In 2007, changed its name to "Chaozhou Vocational Technical School".

On September 17, 2009, when he was mayor of Chaozhou, Tang Xikun, to Fengyang new campus construction site inspections, and to speed up the construction of the new campus.

In 2011 August, Fengyang campus, built and put into use, the Chaozhou Vocational Technical School has two campuses.

On August 1, 2015, Chaozhou City Vocational and technical school generals tomorrow Lane campus transferred to Hongqiao vocational and technical school. Since then, Chaozhou City vocational technical schools only Fengyang a campus. On August 24, Xu Xuwen (former Chaozhou senior technical school principal) to replace Zhang Senzhen, came to power as president.

Now 
Chaozhou Vocational Technical School covers an area of 468.4 acres, a total of 221 students, staff, a total of more than 4500 people. Living facilities of the dormitories, canteens and other.Chaozhou Vocational Technical School since 2000 Zhang Senzhen came to power, the development speed to speed up the pace of the school, enrollment soaring. Plus 2011 Fengyang new campus building, the school covers an area of, the number of teachers and students has increased by two times the original. Now, Chaozhou Vocational Technical School is a vocational education in Chaozhou City, leading, and radiation throughout the eastern region.

Idea of the establishment 
Clear the "Technical Vocational College Chaozhou culture, excellent skills and theory" principles of education, personnel training mode of "double certificates". The graduate employment, is established by the "wish to go. School, study, "make a real practice, innovation" motto, "in the overall implementation of quality education, strengthening the actual practice operation skill training, independent creative talent innovation consciousness, innovation" is the motto of the party's basic line with the running of schools of socialism strict enforcement of the party's educational policy, vocational education actively deep column Michiko new technology, new image to establish vocational schools, the work of the school education, strict management, strict education, excellent school spirit "to get the affirmation of the society.

Teaching equipment 
Chaozhou Vocational Technical School and technical education, training facilities and equipment, advanced multimedia education system of the modern multimedia network system was built. The modernization of the high level professional training facilities.

Campus life style 
Chaozhou Vocational Technical School campus life rich and colorful. In May 4th of each year on the eve of the festival, held a "five four" art show and campus singer competition ten. The School Aerobics Team participated in the biennial Chaozhou city schools, kindergartens aerobics competition. Union and community activities. So is the sports, such as basketball tournament, held three. In October each year, the school's high level of students to participate in military training, for a period of one week, instructors from an army Chinese PLA Guangzhou military region in Chaozhou city. Each year on March 12, tree planting day, the school China Communist Youth League members actively participate in tree planting activities.

Student life condition 
According to the living conditions of students as boarders and day students, school students and day students and day students for lunch. Students have day card (divided into two categories, for the day and day lunch card), when the school day students are required to produce a certificate to the school. Students need to night in the classroom in the evening (or night), then to the dormitory, dormitory students Friday afternoon to go home, to next Monday afternoon off.

Traffic 

Chaozhou Vocational Technical School with campuses in the ancient town of the two industrial zone Chaoan District Fengyang village, part of studying in the campus of the School of Chaozhou City, need to take the No. 13 bus (Fenguang Agricultural School - Jinshan middle school, Chaozhou city bus company limited to the school known as the "Fenguang Agricultural School"(Chinese: 枫洋农校)) to reach the campus so, after school.

Campus facilities 
 Comprehensive building (the principal's office, church and State Department, Dean, teachers in the office)
 Teaching building (room)
 Training building (computer)
 Library
 Stadium (mainly used for meetings, performances and sports competitions)
 Playground (basketball, football field, horizontal bar, parallel bars and other sports equipment in this)
 Dining room (a total of two layers, second layers with the restaurant staff)
 Dormitory (divided into student dormitories and staff accommodation)
 Host flag (hoisting Flag of the People's Republic of China)

Majors 
 Application of computer and network technology (Chinese: 计算机应用与网络技术)
 Business English (Chinese: 商务英语)
 Electronic commerce (Chinese: 电子商务)
 Accounting computerization (Chinese: 会计电算化)
 Application of electronic technology (Chinese: 电子技术应用)
 Vehicle use and repair (Chinese: 汽车运用与维修)
 Numerical control technology and die manufacturing (Chinese: 数控技术与模具制造)
 Design and art decoration process (Chinese: 装潢设计与美术工艺)
 Social culture and art (Chinese: 社会文化艺术)
 Tourism management and service (Chinese: 旅游管理与服务)
 Fashion and art design (Chinese: 服装艺术设计)
 Chaozhou cuisine (Chinese: 潮菜烹饪)
 Landscape Engineering (Chinese: 园林工程)
 Animal husbandry and veterinary medicine (Chinese: 畜牧兽医)
 Integrated management of rural economy (Chinese: 农村经济综合管理)
 Chaozhou opera (Chinese: 潮剧戏曲表演)

Successive Principals

Uniform 

Chaozhou Vocational Technical School uniform in use today for the second edition, the replacement of the new school in the school enabled (specific time unknown at present), to replace the original first edition uniforms, uniforms and the uniforms in winter into summer.
 Summer school uniform coat, white collar and cuff, dark blue pattern with two red stripes, left chest painted emblem.
 Winter uniform jacket white collar and sleeve edges are dark blue, dark blue shoulder two line, sleeves with a thick black and blue, the edge of the bag, clothing is blue black, left chest painted emblem.
 For the dark blue trousers, with two pockets, pocket has a red white isosceles triangle, write "CZMVS (that is, the school's English abbreviation).".

Gallery

References

External links 
 Chaozhou Vocational Technical School Website

Chaozhou